Suzuki Raider may refer to:

 Suzuki Raider 150, motorcycle  manufactured by Suzuki from 2003
 Suzuki T305 Raider, 305 cc motorcycle manufactured by Suzuki in 1968-69